The Taipei Metro Dazhi station is located in the Zhongshan District in Taipei, Taiwan. It is a station of Brown Line.

Station overview

This two-level, underground station features an island platform, three exits, and a platform elevator located on the south side of the concourse level. This station, along with  station, are the only two underground stations on the Wenhu line. They are also the first underground stations in the system to have platform doors.

The theme for this station is "Landscape".

History
23 May 2002: Construction begins on Dazhi station.
28 April 2008: Construction is completed.
4 July 2009: Begins service with opening of Brown Line.

Station layout

Exits
Exit 1: Da-zhi St. (Da-zhi Community) 
Exit 2: Intersection of Bei-an and Da-zhi St.
Exit 3: Intersection of Bei-an and Da-zhi St.

Around the stations
 Dajia Riverside Park
 National Revolutionary Martyrs' Shrine
 Shih Chien University
 Straits Exchange Foundation
 Yingfeng Riverside Park
 Dominican International School

References

Wenhu line stations
Railway stations opened in 2009